Delomerista is a genus of parasitoid wasps belonging to the family Ichneumonidae.

The species of this genus are found in Europe, Southern Africa and Northern America.

Species:
 Delomerista borealis Walkley, 1960

References

Ichneumonidae
Ichneumonidae genera